The 2015 Ju-Jitsu World Championship were the 13th edition of the Ju-Jitsu World Championships, and were held in Bangkok, Thailand from November 20 to November 22, 2015.

Schedule 
20.11.2015 – Men's and Women's Fighting System, Men's Jiu-Jitsu (ne-waza), Women's Duo System – Classic, Mixed Duo System – Show
21.11.2015 – Men's and Women's Fighting System, Men's Jiu-Jitsu (ne-waza), Men's Duo System – Classic, Women's Duo System – Show
22.11.2015 – Women's Jiu-Jitsu (ne-waza), Men's Duo System – Show, Mixed Duo System – Classic, Team event

European Ju-Jitsu

Fighting System

Men's events

Women's events

Duo System

Duo Classic events

Duo Show events

Brazilian Jiu-Jitsu

Men's events

Women's events

Team event

Links

References

External links
Official results (PDF)
Results of team event (PDF)